The defending champions were Jonas Björkman and Max Mirnyi; however, they lost in the quarterfinals against Mahesh Bhupathi and Radek Štěpánek.
Mark Knowles and Daniel Nestor won the title, defeating ninth seeds Lukáš Dlouhý and Pavel Vizner in the final.

Seeds

Draw

Finals

Top half

Section 1

Section 2

Bottom half

Section 3

Section 4

External links
2007 French Open – Men's draws and results at the International Tennis Federation

Men's Doubles
2007